Tang Jitian is a human rights lawyer in the People's Republic of China. Based in Beijing, he is a prominent figure in the Weiquan (rights defending) movement, and has defended victims of illegal land requisitions, Falun Gong adherents, HIV/AIDS victims, and other vulnerable groups, including fellow human rights lawyers.

Due to the politically sensitive nature of Tang's cases, he has met with reprisals from Chinese authorities.  In 2010, he was permanently disbarred, though he has continued his rights advocacy. He has been placed under house arrest, and detained on several occasions. In 2014, Tang and three other lawyers were detained for investigating the detention of several members of Falun Gong. Tang claimed to have been tortured and suffering multiple fractures during his 15-day detention. In 2017 he was turned back by border guards at Lo Wu Control Point when attempting to visit Hong Kong for medical treatment, and advised that he was prohibited from leaving mainland China due to national security reasons. In December 2021, Tang vanished before arriving in Beijing for a human rights event hosted by the European Union and remained missing at the start of the 2022 Winter Olympics; his relatives believed him to be held in a form of secret detention commonly applied to dissidents in China.

Legal career and advocacy
Tang Jitian was born in Yanji, Jilin province in northeast China in 1969.  He began his legal career in Guangdong province in 2005, and subsequently relocated to Beijing to work with the Anhui Law Firm. There, he has taken on a variety of human rights causes, including representing petitioners subjected to reeducation through labor camps, victims of forced eviction, parents of children poisoned by melamine-tainted milk, religious minorities, and others. Tang was also a signatory of Charter 08.

References

Northeast Normal University alumni
20th-century Chinese lawyers
21st-century Chinese lawyers
Chinese human rights activists
Weiquan movement
Living people
1969 births